Andreas Hadenius (born 18 March 1991) is a Swedish footballer who plays as a defender for IF Sylvia.

Hadenius signed on loan for Scottish Premiership club Dundee in January 2019.

References

External links
 
 
 

1991 births
Living people
Association football defenders
IFK Norrköping players
Swedish footballers
Sweden youth international footballers
Halmstads BK players
Allsvenskan players
Superettan players
IF Sylvia players
IFK Värnamo players
Swedish expatriate footballers
Swedish expatriate sportspeople in Scotland
Expatriate footballers in Scotland
Dundee F.C. players
Scottish Professional Football League players